Baike.com, formerly Hudong and Hoodong, is a for-profit social network in Chinese, including the world's largest Chinese encyclopedia. It is one of the two largest wikis in China, along with Baidu Baike, claiming to have more than 18 million articles as of 2020 and more than 5.77 million volunteers, as of April 2013.

History 
Baike.com was founded in 2005 by CEO Pan Haidong, who had moved back to China after earning a PhD in systems engineering from Boston University in 2002.

Baike.com, a 2007 RedHerring 100 Asia company, developed its own wiki software platform, called HDWiki, as a rival to MediaWiki. The system has some social networking-like interactive features, such as user profile, friends and groups. The first version was released in November 2006 and by November 2007 version 3 with added functions, features, and more stability was released.

The HDWiki software is free for non-commercial use, has been downloaded 200,000 times and currently supports over 1,000 other web sites in China (as of December 2007), consisting mostly of tech researchers, open source software groups, government, universities, and high school students.

In 2011, it was announced that Draper Fisher Jurvetson had invested $15 million in Baike.com.

On 22 February 2011, Baike.com submitted a complaint to the State Administration for Industry and Commerce asking for a review of the behavior of Baidu, accusing it of being monopolistic.

In December 2012, the company changed its English name from Hudong to Baike.com.

In 2019, the company was acquired by ByteDance.

Features 
Baike.com is a wiki and lets its users edit and contribute material. Frequent users may accumulate credits redeemable for gifts. It has also included features of social networking sites, including chat forums and fan groups. Baike.com is a for-profit business partially supported by advertising and paid support services.

See also 

Chinese Wikipedia

References

Further reading 
 Zhang, Yuwei. "I don't see Hudong as a competitor: Wiki founder." (Archive) China Daily. 24 February 2011.

External links 

2005 establishments in China
Chinese online encyclopedias
Internet properties established in 2005
Wiki communities
21st-century encyclopedias
ByteDance